Hide and Go Shriek (also known as Close Your Eyes and Pray in the United Kingdom) is a 1988 American slasher film directed by Skip Schoolnik in his directorial debut, and starring Bunky Jones, Annette Sinclair, Brittain Frye, Donna Baltron, George Thomas, and Sean Kanan in his film debut. The story details a group of teenagers who celebrate their graduation by staying the night inside a furniture store, where they are stalked and murdered by a cross-dressing killer during a game of hide and go seek.

Plot
Four couples - Judy and David, John and Bonnie, Randy and Kim, and Shawn and Melissa - have just graduated from high school and are preparing to sneak into a furniture store owned by John's father, Phil. The teenagers begin to drink beer and party as John gives them a tour of the entire store. Kim suggests playing hide-and-go-seek. During the second round, Melissa and Shawn are killed by an unknown murderer.

At midnight, the remaining six regroup to eat dinner, all concerned about Shawn and Melissa's whereabouts. The group searches everywhere, but are unable to find them. The couples go to bed. As John and Bonnie are having sex, a man dressed in Shawn's clothes enters the room and incites John to chase after him. They start a fight, but the killer impales a mannequin's arm through John's stomach, killing him.

One by one, the others wake up. The group calls the police, but find the phone line cut and all exits chained shut. They begin to panic and try to get the attention of a vagabond, then a passing cop car, but to no avail. They discover the dead bodies of their friends and arm themselves with weapons, ready to fight back. Outside, a shopkeeper notices them in the store and calls the cops to report an intrusion.

The group encounters Fred, an ex-convict employee hiding out in the building. Believing him to be the killer, they knock him unconscious and tie him up. The group gets in the elevator but Kim does not make it in time and is decapitated by the moving elevator car.

When the killer attacks the group, Fred appears and tackles the killer, who is revealed to be Zack, Fred's gay lover from prison. Zack tells Fred that he killed the teenagers as he thought they were coming between him and Fred. Fred rejects Zack, who attacks Fred with a knife. Judy lunges forward to slash Zack with a razor. Zack leaps back and stumbles over Kim's severed head before falling down the empty elevator shaft. After that, the police and Phil arrive. As Phil asks Fred what had happened, Fred succumbs to his wounds and dies.

The surviving teenagers are checked over by paramedics before leaving the store and getting into an ambulance. In the final scene, Zack turns out to be driving the ambulance.

Cast

 Bunky Jones as Bonnie Williams
 Brittain Frye as Randy Flint
 Annette Sinclair as Kim Downs
 George Thomas as David Hanson
 Donna Baltron as Judy Ramerize
 Scott Fults as Shawn Phillips
 Ria Pavia as Melissa Morgan
 Sean Kanan as John Robbins
 Scott Kubay as Zack
 Jeff Levine as Fred
 Michael Kelly as the alley Wino
 Ron Colby as Phil Robbins
 Donald Mark Spencer as Vince
 James Serrano and Lyons as the cops in the police car
 Robin Turk as the prostitute in the opening scene
 Joe White as the man behind the newsstand

Release
The film was given a limited theatrical release in the United States on November 1, 1988, by New Star Entertainment, which has its violence trimmed in order to receive an R rating.

Home media
Hide and Go Shriek was released unrated on VHS by New Star Video and New World Video respectively in 1989, as well as on LaserDisc by Image Entertainment. In the United Kingdom, it was marketed as Close Your Eyes and Pray for its home video release, which was shorn of fifty seconds.

The film was initially released on DVD in the United Kingdom by Bellevue Entertainment A/S on July 22, 2004, under its original title. Scanbox Entertainment issued another DVD in Region 2, and was included in a 'Platinum Collection' with Dolly Dearest, Inner Sanctum 2, and Dark Breed. Hide and Go Shriek was released by Code Red on Blu-ray for the first time on December 3, 2016, with a remastered 2K scan from the original internegative, and was followed by a DVD release by Kino Lorber on May 30, 2017. The same year, 88 Films released the film on dual Blu-ray and DVD format in the United Kingdom on July 10, which was subsequently reissued on Blu-ray on February 11, 2019.

Notes

References

External links
 
 

1988 independent films
1988 LGBT-related films
1980s mystery films
1980s slasher films
1980s teen horror films
1988 films
1988 horror films
American independent films
American LGBT-related films
American mystery films
American slasher films
American teen horror films
Cross-dressing in American films
Films about games
Films set in department stores
Films shot in Los Angeles
LGBT-related horror films
1988 directorial debut films
1980s English-language films
1980s American films